This is a list of all the United States Supreme Court cases from volume 344 of the United States Reports:

External links

1952 in United States case law
1953 in United States case law